Lucas Dias may refer to:
Lucas Dias (basketball) (born 1995), Brazilian basketball player
Lucas Dias (footballer, born 1997), Brazilian football forward
Lucas Dias (footballer, born 1999), French footballer goalkeeper
Lucas Dias (soccer, born 2003), Canadian soccer midfielder